Zhusang (Mandarin: 祝桑乡) is a township in Yajiang County, Garzê Tibetan Autonomous Prefecture, Sichuan, China. In 2010, Zhusang Township had a total population of 3,383: 1,768 males and 1,615 females: 806 aged under 14, 2,362 aged between 15 and 65 and 215 aged over 65.

References 
 

Township-level divisions of Sichuan
Populated places in the Garzê Tibetan Autonomous Prefecture